Riistavesi is a medium-sized lake in the Vuoksi main catchment area. It is located in the Northern Savonia region in Finland, close to the town of Kuopio.

See also
List of lakes in Finland

References

Lakes of Kuopio